Alan fitz Walter (1140 – 1204) was hereditary High Steward of Scotland and a crusader.

Life 
Alan was the son and heir of Walter fitz Alan, by his spouse Eschina, who was possibly a member of a family from the south of Scotland. From 1178, the time of his succession to his father, until his death in 1204, Alan served as Steward of Scotland (dapifer) to William the Lion, King of Scots. It was during Alan's lifetime that his family acquired the Isle of Bute. He was possibly responsible for the erection of Rothesay Castle on the island.

Alan allegedly accompanied Richard the Lionheart on the Third Crusade, from which he returned to Scotland in July 1191. None of the references, however, can be traced back to the period.

A Royal Grant to Kinloss Abbey, signed at Melrose Abbey was made between 1179 and 1183. Amongst the witnesses are the Abbot of Melrose, the Abbot of Newbottle, Richard de Morville, Constable of Scotland, 'Alan, son of Walter the Steward, and William de Lauder.

Alan became a patron of the Knights Templar and is responsible for expanding Templar influence in Scotland. There is no evidence, however, that he joined the Order before his death.

He appears as a witness to other charters of William The Lion.

He is buried with his father in Paisley Abbey.

Marriage and issue
He married firstly, Eva, who is usually named as the daughter of Sweyn Thor'sson, although some historians dispute Eva's parentage. They had no known issue.

By his second marriage to Alesta, daughter of Morggán, Earl of Mar
 and Ada, mother of Avelina (FitzAlan) de Carrick, Leonard FitzAlan and Eupheme Stewart

David, died without issue, before his father.
Walter Stewart, 3rd High Steward of Scotland, married Bethóc, daughter of Gille Críst, Earl of Angus and his wife Marjorie. He died in 1246.
Leonard
Avelina, married Donnchadh, Earl of Carrick

Notes

References
 Mackenzie, A. M., MA., D.Litt., The Rise of the Stewarts, London, 1935, pps.10–11.

External links
Alan Stewart, son of Walter (d.1204) @ People of Medieval Scotland 1093–1371

1140 births
1204 deaths
Christians of the Third Crusade
High Stewards of Scotland
Alan